The 2007 Cork Premier Intermediate Football Championship was the second staging of the Cork Premier Intermediate Football Championship since its establishment by the Cork County Board in 2006. The draw for the opening round fixtures took place on 10 December 2006. The championship began on 7 April 2007 and ended on 20 October 2007.

St. Vincent's left the championship after securing promotion to senior level. Béal Átha'n Ghaorthaidh, Mallow and St. Michael's joined the championship.

The final, a North Cork derby, was played on 20 October 2007 at Páirc Uí Rinn in Cork, between Mallow and Killavullen. Mallow won the match by 1-07 to 0-07 to claim their first championship title in the grade and a first title in any football grade since 1992. It was their first ever championship title in the grade.

Glanmire's James Murphy was the championship's top scorer with 0-21.

Team changes

To Championship

Promoted from the Cork Intermediate Football Championship
 Béal Átha'n Ghaorthaidh

Relegated from the Cork Senior Football Championship
 Mallow
 St. Michael's

From Championship

Promoted to the Cork Senior Football Championship
 St. Vincent's

Results

Round 1

Round 2

Béal Átha'n Ghaorthaidh received a bye

Round 3

Quarter-finals

Semi-finals

Final

Championship statistics

Top scorers

Overall

In a single game

References

Cork Premier Intermediate Football Championship